Julius Baker (September 23, 1915 – August 6, 2003) was one of the foremost American orchestral flute players. During the course of five decades he concertized with several of America's premier orchestral ensembles including the Chicago Symphony and the New York Philharmonic Orchestra.

Background
Baker was born in Cleveland, Ohio, and at age nine started flute lessons with his Jewish-Russian immigrant father. Later he studied with August Caputo and local flautist Robert Morris. He attended the Eastman School of Music, where he was pupil of Leonardo De Lorenzo, and the Curtis Institute, where he studied with William Kincaid and had classes with Marcel Tabuteau. Upon graduation in 1937, Baker returned to Cleveland to play second flute in the Cleveland Orchestra, conducted by Artur Rodziński, and in the section led by Maurice Sharp. He went on to a distinguished and long tenure as principal flute in the New York Philharmonic.

Career

Teaching, performing

Julius Baker was well known as a teacher and served as a faculty member at the Juilliard School from 1954, the Curtis Institute of Music from 1980, and Carnegie Mellon University from 1991. He made many recordings with conductors such as Bruno Walter and Leonard Bernstein, and played second flute with the Cleveland Orchestra from 1937-1941.

Baker emerged as principal flautist with the Pittsburgh Symphony Orchestra under Fritz Reiner from 1941–1943, the CBS Symphony Orchestra under Alfredo Antonini at the CBS network in New York City (1943-1951), with the Chicago Symphony Orchestra under Rafael Kubelik from 1951–1953, and subsequently with the New York Philharmonic for 18 years, beginning in 1965 under such legendary conductors as: Leonard Bernstein, Pierre Boulez and Zubin Mehta. During that time he also played in the Columbia Symphony Orchestra.

Baker loved chamber music and was one of the founding members of the Bach Aria Group, with whom he played from 1946 to 1964. Baker also performed on several notable film scores, including The Little Mermaid, Beauty and the Beast and Lovesick. In addition, he appeared opposite violinist Oscar Shumsky in filming Bach's Brandenburg Concerto No. 5, with pianist and conductor Glenn Gould for CBC Television. Baker also collaborated with Glenn Gould, the violinist Rafael Druian and members of the New York Philharmonic in a recording of Johann Sebastian Bach's Brandenberg Concerto No. 4 in G Major, BWV 1049.
 
In addition to film, Baker was also featured on network television in such noted programs as: The Dick Cavett Show in 1971 and the Public Broadcasting Service series Great Performances in 1995.

Baker gave the first American performance with orchestra of the Ibert Flute Concerto in 1948 with the CBS Symphony, and that concert was later issued on his own label, Oxford Records. Baker also collaborated with his friend John Serry, Sr. during his tenure at CBS and produced a demonstration recording in 1951 of Mr. Serry's compositions for flute and accordion entitled La Culebra and Desert Rumba, both of which were dedicated to Baker.

Baker retired from the New York Philharmonic in 1983 in order to devote himself to playing recitals programs and concertos around the United States, Europe and Asia.

In 1997 and 1999 he was jury member at the International Flute Competition "Leonardo De Lorenzo", held every two years in Viggiano, Italy.

The Oxford Recording Company
Baker was also an electronics buff and amateur ham radio operator. He built audio equipment upon which he taped his early solo recordings. The Flute Talk article explained, "His interest in electronics developed into The Oxford Recording Company, a mail-order business he ran out of his home and which produced five of his flute recordings between 1946 and 1951.

Notable pupils 
{{ external media|align=center|width=200px|video1=You may see Julius Baker performing with Glenn Gould in Bach's Brandenburg Concerto No. 5 for the CBC Television documentary "Glenn Gould on Bach" in 1962  Here on bing.com|video2=Photograph of Julius Baker recording with the Columbia Symphony Orchestra in 1948 [https://www.gettyimages.co.nz/detail/news-photo/columbia-symphony-orchestra-performer-orchestral-flute-news-photo/698574384?adppopup=true 'Here on Getty Images.co.nz]}}
 Paula Robison, a well-known soloist and chamber musician who is now on the faculty of the New England Conservatory
 Jeffrey Khaner, currently principal flutist of the Philadelphia Orchestra
 Mimi Stillman, soloist, chamber musician, and Artistic Director of Dolce Suono Ensemble
 John Curran of the Rhode Island Philharmonic Orchestra and Brown University.
 Gary Schocker, a flute soloist and composer
 Jeanne Baxtresser, who succeeded him as principal flutist of the New York Philharmonic and recently retired to devote herself to teaching at Carnegie Mellon School of Music
 Jasmine Choi, former principal flutist of the Vienna Symphony Orchestra
 Valerie Coleman, flutist, composer, and founder of Imani Winds
 Eugenia Zukerman 
 Marina Piccinini, international soloist and chamber musician, faculty of Peabody Institute and Hochschule für Musik, Theater und Medien Hannover
 Hubert Laws, Jazz and Classical virtuoso.
 Trudy Kane, former principal flutist of the New York Metropolitan Opera and former Professor of Flute at the University of Miami
 Demarre McGill, principal flutist of the Seattle Symphony Orchestra
 Christina Smith, principal flutist of the Atlanta Symphony Orchestra
 Joshua Smith, principal flutist of the Cleveland Orchestra
 Viviana Guzman, International Soloist and Professor of Flute at the University of California at Santa Cruz
 Nadine Asin, former piccoloist of the New York Metropolitan Opera, Flute Faculty at Aspen Music Festival, Principal Flutist of the Palm Beach Symphony, and Principal Flutist of the Florida Grand Opera
 Alberto Almarza, Professor of Flute at Carnegie Mellon University
 Marco Granandos, International Soloist, former Professor of Flute at Longy School of Music at Bard College, and Composer

Death
Julius Baker died in 2003, aged 87.

DiscographySerenade In D Major, Op. 25 and Trio In C Minor Op. 9, No. 3 (Decca, 1953)Poem For Flute And Orchestra and A Night Piece For Flute And String Quartet (Decca, 1952)Eighteenth Century Flute Duets with Jean-Pierre Rampal (1959)The Virtuoso Flute with the Vienna State Opera Orchestra (Vanguard, 1967)The Art of Julius Baker (Desmar, 1977)Julius Baker in Recital (VAI 1993)The Virtuoso Flute Vol. 2 (1996)
With Coleman Hawkins
 The Hawk in Hi Fi (RCA Victor, 1956)

See also

References

External links
 
 Julius Baker on imdb.com
 Obituary at The New York Times''
 Julius Baker Music Collection at The Juilliard School of Music - Lila Acheson Wallace Library
 Audio recording of Debussy: Prelude a l'apres-midi d'un faune (Baker w/piano) (1982)- Baker in performance with Lisa Emenheiser Logan (piano) on Archive.org
 Audio recording of - Vivaldi: Flute-Basson Concerto in G minor (La Notte) (Baker, Janigro) (1964) Baker in performance with Karl Hoffmann (bassoon) and Herbert Tachezi (harpsichord) with I Solisti di Zagreb conducted by Antonio Janigro on Archive.org
 Musical score by John Serry Sr.- "La Culebra": dedicated to Julius Baker as archived at the Juilliard School of Music (1951) on library.juilliard.edu* * 
  Musical score byJohn Serry Sr. - African Bolero: Desert Rumba" dedicated to Julius Baker as archived at the Juilliard School of Music (1951) on library.juilliard.edu</ref>

1915 births
2003 deaths
American classical flautists
Carnegie Mellon University faculty
Curtis Institute of Music faculty
Juilliard School faculty
People from Danbury, Connecticut
Musicians from Cleveland
20th-century American musicians
20th-century American male musicians
20th-century classical musicians
New York Philharmonic
Classical musicians from Connecticut
Classical musicians from Ohio
American people of Russian descent
20th-century flautists